Kim Torkildsen (born 30 April 1945) is a Norwegian sailor. He was born in Oslo. He competed at the 1976 Summer Olympics in Montreal, where he placed 16th in three-person keelboat, together with Morten Rieker and Peder Lunde Jr.

References

External links

1945 births
Living people
Sportspeople from Oslo
Norwegian male sailors (sport)
Olympic sailors of Norway
Sailors at the 1976 Summer Olympics – Soling